Europium(II) fluoride is an inorganic compound with a chemical formula EuF2. It was first synthesized in 1937.

Production
Europium(II) fluoride can be produced by reducing europium(III) fluoride with metallic europium or hydrogen gas

Properties
Europium(II) fluoride is a bright yellowish solid with a fluorite structure.

EuF2 can be used to dope a trivalent rare-earth fluoride, such as LaF3, to create a vacancy-filled structure with increased conductivity over a pure crystal. Such a crystal can be used as a fluoride-specific semipermeable membrane in a fluoride selective electrode to detect trace quantities of fluoride.

References

Europium(II) compounds
Fluorides
Lanthanide halides
Substances discovered in the 1930s
Fluorite crystal structure